Daniil Sergeyevich Vigovskiy (born 27 March 2001) is a Russian football player. He plays for Khimki-M.

References

External links

2001 births
Living people
Russian footballers
Footballers from Luhansk
Association football midfielders
FC Energetik-BGU Minsk players
FK Spartaks Jūrmala players
FC Znamya Truda Orekhovo-Zuyevo players
Belarusian Premier League players
Latvian Higher League players
Russian Second League players
Russian expatriate footballers
Expatriate footballers in Belarus
Russian expatriate sportspeople in Belarus
Expatriate footballers in Latvia
Russian expatriate sportspeople in Latvia